Thomas Ferguson (born 1949) is an American political scientist and author who writes on politics and economics, often within a historical perspective. He is best known for his Investment Theory of Party Competition, described in detail in his 1995 book Golden Rule: The Investment Theory of Party Competition and the Logic of Money-driven Political Systems.

Biography
Ferguson obtained his Ph.D. from Princeton University before teaching at the Massachusetts Institute of Technology and the University of Texas, Austin. He later moved to the University of Massachusetts Boston where he is now Emeritus Professor of Political Science. Ferguson is a member of the advisory board for the Institute for New Economic Thinking where he is Director of Research, and was also a senior fellow at the Roosevelt Institute.

Alongside his academic work Ferguson has also contributed widely to popular media. He has been a contributing editor at The Nation and a contributing writer to The Huffington Post. He is also a contributing editor at AlterNet.

Investment theory of party competition

Ferguson is best known for his investment theory of party competition, which was detailed most extensively in his 1995 book Golden Rule: The Investment Theory of Party Competition and the Logic of Money-Driven Political Systems. The theory states that political systems featuring party competition are best understood as competitions for investment from wealthy segments of society. This is because political campaigns are expensive, and so political parties whose policies are most attractive to wealthy 'investors' will tend to be more successful as they are better able to attract the finances required to win election campaigns.

The theory contrasts with the median voter theorem, which states that the outcome of elections will be the preferences of the median voter as political parties converge on the 'center ground' as they compete for votes.

In 2009, the documentary Golden Rule: The Investment Theory of Politics about the theory was released, it featured speakers including Thomas Ferguson, Noam Chomsky and Michael Albert.

MIT controversy 
According to Noam Chomsky, Ferguson was warned while at MIT that his research might get him denied tenure in the political science department. In Chomsky's account, Ferguson was told "If you ever want to get tenure in this department, keep away from anything after the New Deal; you can write all of your radical stuff up to the New Deal, but if you try and do it for the post-New Deal period, you're never going to get tenure in this department." Although not explicitly mentioned, the research was ostensibly the investment theory of party competition.

Selected works 
Ferguson has written numerous scholarly articles, magazine pieces, and a number of books.

Books

Scholarly 

Epstein, Gerald; Ferguson, Thomas (1984). "Monetary Policy, Loan Liquidation, and Industrial Conflict: The Federal Reserve and the Open Market Operations of 1932". The Journal of Economic History. 44 (4): 957-983.

 Longer version available here.

Ferguson, Thomas; Johnson, Robert (2011). "A World Upside Down? Deficit Fantasies in the Great Recession". International Journal of Political Economy. 40 (1): 3-47. doi:10.2753/IJP0891-1916400101.

Popular 
 "Financial Regulation? Don't Get Your Hopes Up", Talking Points Memo, 2008-04-17
 "Bridge Loan to Nowhere?", The Nation, 2008-09-24

References

External links 
 UMass Boston polisci profile
 Thomas Ferguson's articles in The Nation.
 Thomas Ferguson's articles in Mother Jones.
 Thomas Ferguson's articles at Alternet.
 "Giant holes in new banking rules" Thomas Ferguson interview on The Real News, November 2009 (video and print transcript).
 "Obama should save banks not bankers" Thomas Ferguson interview on The Real News, March 2009 (video and print transcript).
 "Money and Power in the 2000 Elections" Thomas Ferguson interview on Democracy Now!, November 7, 2000 (audio and print transcript).
 Profile at Institute for New Economic Thinking
 Profile at the Roosevelt Institute 

1949 births
American political scientists
Princeton University alumni
University of Massachusetts Boston faculty
Living people